Werner Fischer (born February 8, 1931 in Gablonz an der Neisse, Czechoslovakia) is a German mineralogist and mathematical crystallographer.

Education and life 
Fischer passed his Abitur in 1951 in Kappeln an der Schlei. Supported by the German National Academic Foundation, he studied at University of Stuttgart and University of Kiel. There he also received his doctorate in 1959 with a thesis on structural studies on synthetic carnallite. In 1970 he habilitated at Philipps-University Marburg with a thesis on homogeneous packing of spheres and their conditions of existence in space groups of tetragonal symmetry. In 1971 he was appointed professor. From 1974 to 1978 he worked at the University of Münster and then worked at the Philipps-University Marburg until his retirement in 1996.

Fischer's research dealt with mathematical crystallography, in particular with periodic minimal surfaces, sphere packings, effective areas, normalizers, lattice complexes, the description of crystal structures and worked on the International Tables for Crystallography. This work was very often done in collaboration with Elke Koch.

Honors and awards 
Fischer received the 2006 Carl Hermann Medal from the German Crystallographic Society.

References 

Living people
1931 births

Mineralogists
Crystallographers
Academic staff of the University of Marburg
Academic staff of the University of Münster
University of Stuttgart alumni
University of Kiel alumni
German mineralogists